Yulia Anatoliivna Svyrydenko (born 25 December 1985) is a Ukrainian politician currently serving as First Vice Prime Minister of Ukraine and simultaneously Minister of Economic Development and Trade of Ukraine since 4 November 2021.

Education
In 2008, she graduated from Kyiv National University of Trade and Economics with a degree in antimonopoly management.

Career
On May 5, 2020, President of Ukraine Volodymyr Zelensky appointed Svyrydenko as the representative of Ukraine in the subgroup on social and economic issues of the Trilateral Contact Group on resolving the situation in Donbas (Ukraine - Organization for Security and Cooperation in Europe - Russia). 
On December 22, 2020, Zelensky appointed Svyrydenko as Deputy Head of the Office of the President to replace Yuliya Kovaliv.

On November 4, 2021, the Parliament of Ukraine appointed Svyrydenko as first deputy prime minister, minister of economy of Ukraine. Some 256 MPs voted for her appointment.

References

1985 births
Living people
People from Chernihiv
Kyiv National University of Trade and Economics alumni
Governors of Chernihiv Oblast
Economy ministers of Ukraine
First vice prime ministers of Ukraine
21st-century Ukrainian politicians
21st-century Ukrainian women politicians
Ukrainian women economists
Eastern Orthodox Christians from Ukraine